Peter Thielst (born 1951) is a Danish philosopher, author and publisher of philosophical books from the Danish bureau "Det lille forlag" ("The little publisher"). He has written biographical works on Kierkegaard and Nietzsche.

Bibliography 

(1977) Driftens fortolkninger
(1978) Den kønspolitiske tænkning
(1980) Søren og Regine
(1984) Psykoanalyse og psykoterapi
(1985) Kierkegaards filosofi (2nd edition 1992, 3rd edition 1999)
(1988) Latterens lyst (2nd edition 1995)
(1988) Drømmens veje
(1989) Narkissos og Ekko
(1989) Alice Miller
(1990) Kønnet, kroppen og selvet
(1991) Selvpsykologi (2nd edition. 1998)
(1992) Den europæiske krop
(1993) Det onde
(1994) Livet må forstås baglæns, men må leves forlæns
(1995) Det gode (2nd edition. 1997, 3rd edition. 2001)
(1996) Man bør tvivle om alt - og tro på meget, introduction to philosophy
(1997) Jeg er ikke noget menneske - jeg er dynamit
(1998) 5 danske filosoffer fra det 19. århundrede
(1998) Det skønne (2nd edition 2001)
(1999) Det sande (2nd edition 2001)
(1999) Nietzsches filosofi
(2000) Kødets lyst - tankens list
(2001) Den bedste af alle verdener
(2002) Den kløvede eros
(2003) Livets mening - eller blot lidt sammenhæng og perspektiv

References 
 Peter Thielst (in Danish)

Danish philosophers
1951 births
Living people
Place of birth missing (living people)